This is the list of archives in Argentina.

Archives in Argentina 

 General Archive of the Nation (Argentina)
 Archivo de la Iglesia Catedral de San Miguel de Tucumán
 Archivo General de la Provincia de Córdoba
 Archivo General de la Provincia de Santiago del Estero
 Archivo Histórico de la Ciudad de Buenos Aires
 Archivo Histórico de la Provincia de Tucumán
 Archivo Histórico Provincial de Salta

See also 

 List of archives
 List of museums in Argentina
 Culture of Argentina
 Portal de Archivos Españoles (federated search of archives in Spain)

External links 
 General Archives (all)

 
Archives
Argentina
Archives